Hocus Pocus Alfie Atkins is a 2013 Danish-Norwegian-Swedish animated feature film directed by Torill Kove. It is based on the book of the same title from the Alfie Atkins book series by Gunilla Bergström.

Plot
Alfie Atkins wants a dog for his birthday, but his father says he's way too small to take care of it. When he goes to school later on, he's also told by the bigger children in school that he's too small to play with them. Alfie then meets an old man that can conjure money out of thin air and decides to use his help to gain a dog.

Cast 
 Markus Engdahl-Alfons Åberg, Mållgan Åberg
 Gustaf Hammarsten-Pappa Åberg
 Per Eggers-Trollkarl
 Gunilla Röör-Trollkarl Fru Singoalla
 Sofia Wendt-Milla Åberg
 Adrian Bratt-Viktor Åberg

Production
TBA

Reception
TBA

References

External links 

2013 films
Swedish animated films
Norwegian animated films
Danish animated films
2013 animated films
Animated films based on children's books
Films directed by Torill Kove
2010s Swedish films